Livet is a commune in the Mayenne department in north-western France.

Livet is also:
 , founder of the institution Livet, now lycée Eugène-Livet (in Nantes, France).
 Several former towns in France were named Livet.

See also
Communes of the Mayenne department
mairie de livet en charnie

References

Communes of Mayenne